Royal Coda is the eponymous debut full-length studio album by American post-hardcore band Royal Coda, released on April 27, 2018, on Blue Swan Records. The album was produced by Dominic Nastasi and Mike Watts. It is the only release to feature the original trio of lead vocalist Kurt Travis, guitarist Sergio Medina, and drummer Joseph Arrington before guitarist Will Swan joined the three musicians the following year.

The album was supported by three singles; "Anything to Save", "Cut Me Under", and "Breathe Correct". The band toured to promote the record, including two headlining tours in 2018 and 2019, a performance at SwanFest, and supporting Tilian Pearson and Hail the Sun on their respective tours.

Background and recording

Royal Coda was first founded by musician Sergio Medina in 2017 after wanting to form a rock musical project which would ideally include various different musicians, guitarists, and vocalists. The band officially announced its formation on January 28, 2018 also revealing that the group had signed a recording contract with independent label Blue Swan Records. Consisting of former Stolas guitarist Sergio Medina, former A Lot Like Birds drummer Joseph Arrington, and former A Lot Like Birds and Dance Gavin Dance vocalist Kurt Travis, the three-piece began recording material for their debut studio album.

The following day after announcing their inception, Royal Coda confirmed via Twitter that they had finished tracking their debut studio album. The band wrote and recorded the album at VuDu Recording Studios in Port Jefferson, New York with producers Dominic Nastasi and Mike Watts.

Promotion

The lead single, "Anything to Save", was released for digital download and streaming services on February 16, 2018. Another single, "Cut Me Under", was released on March 29, along with the official announcement of their debut studio album, with a scheduled release date of April 27, 2018. A third single, "Breathe Correct", was released on April 12, 2018, which premiered on Substream Magazine.

Royal Coda was made available to stream a day before its release date, on April 26, 2018, on New Noise Magazine.

In support of the debut release, Royal Coda performed their first two concerts at Family Vacation Music Festival in Sacramento, California on May 19 and at Chain Reaction in Anaheim, California on May 20, 2018. The band also toured as support on American musician Tilian's headlining solo U.S. tour from August 23 to September 23, 2018, alongside Sunsleep and Andrés. On the tour, the band recruited The Fall of Troy vocalist and guitarist Thomas Erak and former Dance Gavin Dance bass guitarist Jason Ellis; it was later revealed that the group confirmed Erak and Ellis as permanent members.

Track listing

All track titles and durations taken from Bandcamp.

Credits and personnel

Royal Coda
 Kurt Travis – lead vocals
 Sergio E. Medina – guitar, bass guitar, programming
 Joseph Arrington – drums, percussion

Production
 Mike Watts – producer, audio engineer
 Dominic Nastasi – producer, audio engineer, mastering engineer
 Sergio E. Medina – composer, artistic direction
 Spencer Haley – art layout
 Sergio A. Medina – photography

References

2018 debut albums
Royal Coda albums
Blue Swan Records albums